Problems and Other Stories is a collection of 23 works of short fiction by John Updike. The volume was published in 1979 by Alfred A. Knopf. The stories were first carried in literary journals, 17 of which appeared in The New Yorker.
Problems and Other Stories is one of two collections of Updike’s short stories that appeared in 1979 (the other is  Too Far to Go: The Maples Stories).

Stories

The stories first appeared in The New Yorker, unless otherwise noted.

“Commercial” (June 10, 1972)

“Minutes of the Last Meeting” (Audience, July–August 1972)

“Believers” (Harper’s Magazine, July 1972)

“The Gun Shop” (November 25, 1972)

“How to Love America and Leave It at the Same Time” (August 19, 1972)

“Nevada” (Playboy, January 1974)

“Son” (April 21, 1973)

“Daughter, Last Glimpses of” (November 5, 1973)

“Ethiopia” (January 14, 1974)

“Transaction” (Oui, March 1974)

“Separating” (June 23, 1975)

“Augustine’s Concubine” (Atlantic Monthly)

“The Man Who Loved Extinct Animals” (July 21, 1975)

“Problems” (November 3, 1975)

“Domestic Life in America” (December 13, 1976)

“Love Song, for a Moog Synthesizer” (June 14, 1974)

“From the Journal of a Leper” (July 19, 1976)

“Here Come the Maples” (October 11, 1976)

“The Fairy Godfathers” (November 8, 1976)

“The Faint” (Playboy, May 1978)

“The Egg Race (June 13, 1977)

“Guilt-Gems” (September 19, 1977)

“Atlantises” (November 13, 1978)

Background

The collection’s title reflects Updike’s opening remark in his Author’s Note: “Seven years since my last short-story collection? There must have been problems.”<ref>Detweiler, 1984 p. 161: “There must have been problems also quoted by Detweiler.</ref> Biographer Adam Begley notes the autobiographical antecedents to the collection:Problems and Other Stories is conspicuous in that “children assume the foreground” in several of the tales that track the “gulf [that widens] between them and their separating parents and sometimes erupts with suppressed anguish”, according to critic Robert M. Luscher.Detweiler, 1984 p. 161”...often with children figuring prominently in the action.”

The geometric diagram that appears on the cover of the 1979 first edition was designed by Updike, and is meant to provide a schematic representation of the relationship between the three characters in the first of the six stories.

Critical AssessmentThe New York Times literary critic John Romano comments on Updike’s style in Problems and Other Stories: “...Updike's own silent insistence that his style is the center, maybe the substance, of his art. Although most of the time it's bound tightly to the work of describing the world, it also has the means and the inclination to call attention to itself. Every few pages we are struck by what might be called a “writer's word,” such as “claxon” or “cruciform.” Or, more often, we come upon a metaphor of astonishing deftness and efficiency; so deft and efficient, paradoxically, that it's liable to distract us. But there's more to Updike's metaphors than this.”

Literary scholar David Thorburn offers this appraisal of the collection:
 

Literary critic Jane Barnes bestows high praise upon the volume:

Theme

The stories in the collection were written between 1971 and 1978, a period in which Updike separated then divorced his first wife Mary Pennington Updike. Literary critic Richard Detweiler notes that “many (but by no means all) of the twenty-three stories concern couples in various stages of separation, or in the aftermath of a divorce, often with children figuring prominently in the action.”Luscher, 1993 p. 123

 Critic Jane Barnes notes that the former hometown settings to which Updike’s protagonists had retreated in earlier stories are no longer reliable as sanctuaries:

Barnes adds: “The narrator’s slow coming to terms with his unhappiness in the marriage, his falling in love…his nerve to act (to divorce and remarry)—all these occur because of revisions of his understanding of the past.”
Updike closes the collection with a story that is emblematic of his theme, “Atlantises”, in which frogmen in training practice emergency escapes to avoid painful or deadly embolisms. The instructor serves to “calm their panic, and show them the discipline of survival.’”Pritchard, 2000 pp. 193–194: Same reference to “frogman” theme.

In a chapter entitled “The Geometry of Guilt”, literary critic Robert M. Luscher identifies Updike’s central theme in Problems and Other Stories: his middle-aged protagonist’s consignment to a purgatory where they “engage in an ongoing struggle with guilt.”

 Footnotes 

 Sources 
Barnes, Jane. 1981. John Updike: A Literary Spider from Virginia Quarterly Review 57 no. 1 (Winter 1981) in John Updike: Modern Critical Views, Harold Bloom, editor. pp. 111–125 
Begley, Adam. 2014. Updike. Harpercollins Publishers, New York. 
Carduff, Christopher.  2013. Ref. 1  Note on the Texts in John Updike: Collected Early Stories. Christopher Carduff, editor. The Library of America. pp. 910-924 
Detweiler, Robert. 1984. John Updike. Twayne Publishers, G. K. Hall & Co., Boston, Massachusetts.  (Paperback).
Luscher, Robert M. 1993. John Updike: A Study of the Short Fiction. Twayne Publishers, New York. 
Pritchard, Richard H.. 2000. Updike: America’s Man of Letters. Steerforth Press, Southroyalton, Vermont.
Romano, John. 1979. Updike’s People. The New York Times, October 28, 1979. https://www.nytimes.com/1979/10/28/archives/updikes-people-updike.html Retrieved 6 March 2023.
Thorburn, David. 1979. Introduction: John Updike: A Collection of Critical Essays. Prentice-Hall, Englewood, NJ. 
Updike, John. 1979. Problems and Other Stories''. Alfred A. Knopf, New York. 

1979 short story collections
Short story collections by John Updike